Canarium grandifolium is a tree in the family Burseraceae. The specific epithet  is from the Latin meaning "large leaf".

Description
The scaly bark is greyish.

Distribution and habitat
Canarium grandifolium grows naturally in Peninsular Malaysia and Borneo. Its habitat is lowland mixed dipterocarp forest.

References

grandifolium
Trees of Peninsular Malaysia
Trees of Borneo
Plants described in 1932